The 1954 Cal Poly San Dimas Broncos football team represented the Cal Poly Kellogg-Voorhis Unit—now known as California State Polytechnic University, Pomona—as an independent during the 1954 college football season. Led by second-year head coach Staley Pitts, Cal Poly San Dimas compiled a record of 1–8. The team was outscored by its opponents 203 to 77 for the season.

Schedule

Notes

References

Cal Poly San Dimas
Cal Poly Pomona Broncos football seasons
Cal Poly San Dimas Broncos football